Edward Reekers (born 24 May 1957, in Hengelo) is a Dutch singer and voice actor. Most notable is his work as lead singer for Dutch progressive rock band Kayak.

Having been a fan of the band for years, Reekers joined Kayak in 1978. He replaced Max Werner, who became the band's drummer. With Reekers as the new lead singer, Kayak immediately scored their biggest European hit single: "Ruthless Queen". The accompanying album Phantom of the Night reached gold in the Netherlands.

Reekers was with Kayak from 1978 until the split in 1982. He sang on three studio albums, and on the live-album "Eyewitness". During live concerts he played occasional keyboards and electric guitar.

He was not involved in the 1999 reunion of the band, but he did make guest appearances at some concerts in 2003. He even replaced Bert Heerink (Kayak's singer at that time) for an entire concert in 2003, when Heerink had other commitments.

In 2005, Reekers re-joined Kayak as one of the singers on their "Nostradamus"-project. When Bert Heerink left the band after the Nostradamus-tour, Reekers was the band's male lead singer again. By this time, female singer Cindy Oudshoorn was also in the band. During the "Kayakoustic" tour of 2006/2007, Reekers also played recorder, kazoo and various percussion instruments.

Apart from his work with Kayak, Reekers sings backing vocals on many albums from Dutch and Belgian artists. He also lends his voice to commercials, radio jingles and cartoon movies. Reekers is a part-time actor and film director, specializing in the Dutch lip-synchronisation of famous films (incl. the Harry Potter films and some Disney cartoons).

He sings lead vocals -along with many other singers- on some albums by Ayreon, a project of Dutch musician Arjen Anthony Lucassen.

Edward Reekers has released 3 solo albums: "The Last Forest" (1981), "Stages" (1993) and "Child of the Water" (2008). On "The Last Forest" Reekers was helped by ex-Kayak members Max Werner and Johan Slager. In Brazil he had a huge hit with "The words to say I love you" in 1983, released in the original soundtrack of the soap opera "Pão pão beijo beijo".

He has released many solo singles in English, German and Dutch.

Discography

Solo albums
The Last Forest (1981)
Stages (1993)
Child of the Water (2008)

With Kayak
Phantom of the Night (1979)
Periscope Life (1980)
Merlin (1981)
Eyewitness (1981)
Nostradamus - The Fate of Man (2005)
Kayakoustic (Live - 2007)
Coming Up For Air (2008)
The Anniversary Concert / The Anniversary Box (Live - 2008)
Letters From Utopia (2009)
Anywhere But Here (2011)

With Ayreon
The Final Experiment (1995)
Actual Fantasy (1996)
Into the Electric Castle (1998)
Universal Migrator Part 1: The Dream Sequencer (2000)
Ayreonauts Only (2000)
Ayreon Universe (2018)
Electric Castle Live and Other Tales (2020)

External links
Official website (in Dutch)
Kayak official website

1957 births
Living people
Dutch male singers
Dutch male voice actors
People from Hengelo
Kayak (band) members